is a former Nippon Professional Baseball pitcher.

Imanaka attended the Daitō campus of Osaka Sangyo University High School, which became Osaka Tōin High School in his final year. He was recognized as the school's ace pitcher and scouted by several clubs including the Yomiuri Giants and his hometown team, the Hanshin Tigers. Despite being a Hanshin fan himself, Imanaka had his sights set solely on playing for the Chunichi Dragons, who had won the league pennant during his final year of high school. Imanaka went as far as declaring that he would not play professional baseball if another team drafted him. Chunichi obliged and selected him in the first round of the 1988 rookie draft.

References

External links

1971 births
Living people
People from Kadoma, Osaka
Japanese baseball players
Nippon Professional Baseball pitchers
Chunichi Dragons players
Japanese baseball coaches
Nippon Professional Baseball coaches
Baseball people from Osaka Prefecture